Gilliver is a surname. Notable people with the surname include:

Allan Gilliver (born 1944), English footballer
Mark Gilliver (born 1969), English cricketer
Peter Gilliver (born 1964), British lexicographer and dictionary editor
Piers Gilliver (born 1994), British wheelchair fencer